Steve Peterson (1950 – July 15, 2008) was an American technical director for NASCAR. He joined NASCAR in 1995 and worked with them up until his death. During his time he worked as a technical director and a safety adviser. He led to the improvement of safety barriers, neck and head restraints as well as seatbelts.

In 1982 he worked as crew chief for driver Mark Martin. In 2006 he was awarded Society of Automotive Engineers Motorsports Achievement Award.

Peterson died of natural causes at his home in Concord, North Carolina. The NASCAR Confidential episode on "Race Control" for the 2008 Coca-Cola 600 at Lowe's Motor Speedway in Concord, NC that aired on Speed TV on July 20, 2008, was dedicated in his memory. A moment of silence was given for Peterson prior to the start of the 2008 Brickyard 400 at Indianapolis Motor Speedway on July 27.

References

1950 births
2008 deaths
NASCAR people
NASCAR crew chiefs